The 1969 GP Ouest-France was the 33rd edition of the GP Ouest-France cycle race and was held on 26 August 1969. The race started and finished in Plouay. The race was won by Jean Jourden.

General classification

References

1969
1969 in road cycling
1969 in French sport